The Town of Fowler is a statutory town located in northwestern Otero County, Colorado, United States. The town population was 1,253 at the 2020 United States Census.

History
Fowler was named for Orson Squire Fowler, a phrenologist who founded the town. The town was incorporated in 1925.

The town was built as a small railroad station for the Atchison, Topeka and Santa Fe Railway. The town was originally named Oxford, for a large ox that was killed when crossing the railroad tracks. The name of the town was changed because there was another town named Oxford located on the rail line.

Geography
Fowler is located at  (38.128343, -104.025007).

Demographics

As of the census of 2000, there were 1206 people, 521 households, and 330 families residing in the town. The racial makeup of the town was 95.02% White, 0.08% Black, 1.08% Native American, 0.17% Asian, 2.99% from other races, and 0.66% from two or more races. Latino or Hispanic of any race were 12.35% of the population.

There were 521 households, out of which 25.9% had children under the age of 18 living with them, 52.8% were married couples living together, 7.7% had a female householder with no husband present, and 36.5% were non-families. 34.5% of all households were made up of individuals, and 16.3% had someone living alone who was 65 years of age or older.  The average household size was 2.22 and the average family size was 2.87.

In the town, the population was spread out, with 22.3% under the age of 18, 7.5% from 18 to 24, 22.5% from 25 to 44, 23.1% from 45 to 64, and 24.6% who were 65 years of age or older.  The median age was 43 years. For every 100 females, there were 84.4 males.  For every 100 females age 18 and over, there were 79.2 males. 

The median income for a household in the town was $25,761, and the median income for a family was $32,143. Males had a median income of $25,536 versus $20,750 for females. The per capita income for the town was $15,501.  About 11.3% of families and 11.9% of the population were below the poverty line, including 13.0% of those under age 18 and 9.3% of those age 65 or over.

Education
The Fowler School District has one elementary school and one high school. The high school mascot is the Grizzlies.

Transportation
Fowler is part of Colorado's Bustang network. It is along the Lamar-Pueblo-Colorado Springs Outrider line.

Public safety
The town has a small police department and fire department. In 1998, the magazine Westword included Fowler among examples of small police departments that struggled to hire or retain their police chiefs. Police chief Floyd Rogers was fired in 1997 after a string of controversies regarding the department's treatment of adolescents. After his firing a crowd of 60 adolescents rioted in Fowler, barricading U.S. Route 50, setting fires, and vandalizing the police station and two police cars.

Notable people
 Luke Hochevar, Major League Baseball pitcher (2007–present); raised in Fowler and pitched at Fowler High School.

Gallery

See also

Colorado
Bibliography of Colorado
Index of Colorado-related articles
Outline of Colorado
List of counties in Colorado
List of municipalities in Colorado
List of places in Colorado

References

External links

Town of Fowler website
CDOT map of the Town of Fowler
Fowler Historical Society, Inc.

Towns in Otero County, Colorado
Towns in Colorado
Colorado populated places on the Arkansas River